Paralaelaps is a genus of mites in the family Pachylaelapidae. There are at least four described species in Paralaelaps.

Species
These four species belong to the genus Paralaelaps:
 Paralaelaps gondarabae Lombardini, 1941
 Paralaelaps kibonotensis (Trägårdh, 1908)
 Paralaelaps major (Berlese, 1918)
 Paralaelaps pietersburgensis Spies & Ryke, 1965

References

Acari